The Swimming Pool (translit. Baseynat) is a 1977 Bulgarian drama film directed by Binka Zhelyazkova. It was entered into the 10th Moscow International Film Festival, where it won the Silver Prize.

Cast
 Kosta Tsonev as Apostol
 Yanina Kasheva as Bella
 Kliment Denchev as Bufo
 Tzvetana Maneva as Dora
 Petar Slabakov
 Georgi Kaloyanchev
 Vassil Mihajlov
 Stefan Stefanov
 Olga Kircheva

References

External links
 

1977 films
1977 drama films
1970s Bulgarian-language films
Films directed by Binka Zhelyazkova
Bulgarian drama films